Sakhalin State University (Russian: Сахалинский государственный университет/tr: Sakhalinskiy gosudarstvenn'iy universitet) is a university located in Yuzhno-Sakhalinsk, Sakhalin. It maintains a sister school relationship with Busan University of Foreign Studies and Dongseo University of the Republic of Korea. As a result of this relationship and the large population of local Sakhalin Koreans, students from Korea form the majority of international students at Sakhalin State University.

Notes

External links
 Official website

Yuzhno-Sakhalinsk
Universities in the Russian Far East